The Antrim International Cross Country, formerly the Belfast International Cross Country, is an annual cross country running meeting which takes place every January in Antrim, Northern Ireland. It is one of the IAAF's cross country permit meetings, as well as being part of the UK Cross Challenge tour. Previous winners include Paula Radcliffe, Paul Tergat and Steve Ovett.

History
The meeting began in 1977 and was held in Mallusk, near Belfast, until 1996. At that point, the course moved for a two-year stint in Barnett Demesne before settling in Stormont in 1999. The course was again moved in 2009, when it became known as the Antrim International Cross Country.

In addition to having been held at numerous venues, the competition has been known under a large variety of names. It was called the Mallusk Crosscountry between 1977 and 1991, except a brief change to the Brooks International Crosscountry in 1989. The meeting was frequently renamed for sponsorship reasons, becoming the Milk International in 1986, the Reebok International Crosscountry in 1992 and 1993, the Ulster Milk Games International in 1994, the Coca-Cola International Crosscountry from 1995 to 1999 and finally the Fila International Crosscountry for 2000–01. During the meeting's time at Stormont it was known as the Belfast International Cross Country and it was in this period that the meeting was elevated to IAAF permit status.

The race course of the meetings at Stormont was on the grounds surrounding Stormont Castle. The current course for the race is on the grassy fields of the Greenmount Campus just outside Antrim town. The races are currently held over 9 km for men and 5.6 km for women. This distance has significantly fluctuated on an annual basis. The men's race was an 8 km from the inaugural edition until 2003. The women's race—introduced in 1986—was previously a 4.8 km race during that period.

Steve Ovett became the first athlete to win the meeting twice, winning in 1978 and 1984. The most successful athlete in the history of the competition is Paula Radcliffe, who has won a record four times (in 1994, 1996, 2000 and 2001). Around 1000 male and female athletes participate in the senior races each year.

Past winners

Statistics

Winners by country

Multiple winners

References

External links
Athletics Northern Ireland website
IAAF Cross Country homepage
2015 results

Cross country running competitions
Athletics competitions in Northern Ireland
Sport in County Antrim
Recurring sporting events established in 1977
Cross country running in the United Kingdom
Annual sporting events in the United Kingdom
Annual events in Northern Ireland
1977 establishments in Northern Ireland
Winter events in Northern Ireland